The Quiet Storm is a 2007 Icelandic drama film written and directed by Guðný Halldórsdóttir. It was entered into the 30th Moscow International Film Festival.

Cast
 Tinna Hrafnsdóttir
 Hilmir Snær Guðnason
 Hera Hilmar (as Hera Hilmarsdóttir)
 Atli Rafn Sigurðsson
 Jörundur Ragnarsson
 Gunnur Martinsdóttir Schlüter as Eyja
 Baltasar Breki Baltasarsson as Diddi
 Arnmundur Ernst Björnsson as Otti
 Þorsteinn Bachmann as Keli
 Thórey Sigthórsdóttir as Dísa eldri

References

External links
 

2007 films
2007 drama films
2000s Icelandic-language films
Films directed by Guðný Halldórsdóttir
Icelandic drama films